The Tenor Scene (also released as The Breakfast Show) is a live album by saxophonists Eddie "Lockjaw" Davis and Johnny Griffin recorded at Minton's Playhouse in 1961 and released on the Prestige label.

Reception

The Allmusic site awarded the album 3 stars with the review by Scott Yanow stating: "The straight-ahead music contains plenty of sparks; this was a classic group."

Track listing 
 "Light and Lovely" (Eddie "Lockjaw" Davis, George Duvivier) - 11:33     
 "Straight, No Chaser" (Thelonious Monk) - 10:03     
 "Woody 'n' You" (Dizzy Gillespie) - 7:20     
 "Bingo Domingo" (Eddie "Lockjaw" Davis) - 4:33     
 "I'll Remember April" (Gene de Paul, Patricia Johnston, Don Raye) - 9:29

Personnel 
Eddie "Lockjaw" Davis - tenor saxophone
Johnny Griffin - tenor saxophone
 Junior Mance - piano
 Larry Gales - bass
 Ben Riley - drums

References 
 

1960 live albums
Eddie "Lockjaw" Davis live albums
Johnny Griffin live albums
Albums produced by Esmond Edwards
Prestige Records live albums